Xijin Bridge, is an ancient Chinese covered bridge or lángqiáo (廊桥) located in Yongkang, Jinhua, Zhejiang Province, China. It is the largest covered bridge in Zhejiang Province, and one of the largest in China.

History
The bridge was constructed during the Ming dynasty as a wooden bridge. In the 57th year of the Kangxi Era (1718), the bridge was rebuilt, and in the early period of the Yongzheng Era, the bridge's piers were replaced with stones to improve its load capacity. At the beginning of the Qianlong Era, the construction of the bridge was finished. During the Jiaqing Era, the bridge was repaired once and in the 12th year (1807), a stone stele (cenotaph) was erected to praise bridge builders and to summarize the history of the bridge.  The inscription on the stele is known as Xijin Qiao Zhi.

Structural parameters
The bridge is a mixed stone and wooden bridge; the piers are made of stone and its upper structures are mostly wooden. When it was a completely wooden bridge, it had a length of 206.3 meters distributed over 15 piers and 16 spans. After the piers were replaced with stone, it was changed to 12 piers and 13 spans and shortened to 166 meters. Each pier has a length of 5.6 meters, a width of 3.3 meters, and height of 4.6 meters. Between every two piers, there are 6 or 7 girders spanning the tops of piers. Each girder has an average length of 13 meters.

See also
 Covered bridge
 Chengyang Bridge, another large lángqiáo (廊桥) in Guangxi, China
 List of bridges in China

References
《永康县志》 (Archive of Yongkang County), official/governmental archive of Yongkang (Qing Dynasty version). Now Yongkang is no longer a county, but a city.
《西津橋志》 (Inscript of Xijin Bridge), a Jiaqing-Era article about the bridge.
《中国桥梁建筑史》 (History of Chinese Bridges), a book on the history of Chinese bridges, written by Mao Yisheng.

Tourist attractions in Zhejiang
Chinese architectural history
Bridges in Jinhua
Covered bridges in China